Hoilett is a surname. Notable people with the surname include:

Abali Hoilett (born 1983), Cayman Islands cricketer
Junior Hoilett (born 1990), Canadian soccer player

See also
Howlett